Darlinghurst Fire Station is a three-storey brick and stone building situated at the prominent location of the junction of Darlinghurst Road and Victoria Street in Darlinghurst in Sydney, New South Wales.

It was designed in 1910 by Walter Liberty Vernon it was built in 1911 and opened in 1912.

References

Darlinghurst, New South Wales
Fire stations completed in 1912
Fire stations in Sydney